Lawrence Tyler Fuglaar, Sr. (September 6, 1895 – April 18, 1972), was a Democrat from Pineville, Louisiana, who served in the Louisiana House of Representatives from 1948 to 1952 during the second administration of Governor Earl Kemp Long.

In 1972, Fuglaar drowned when his boat capsized while he was fishing with his wife on Toledo Bend Reservoir near Hemphill in Sabine County in East Texas. His second wife, Leona J. Fuglaar (1911-1985), summoned for help and survived.

Fuglaar and his second wife are interred at Greenwood Memorial Park in Pineville.

References

1895 births
1972 deaths
Democratic Party members of the Louisiana House of Representatives
People from Pineville, Louisiana
Deaths by drowning in the United States
20th-century American politicians